The women's 400m freestyle events at the 2022 World Para Swimming Championships were held at the Penteada Olympic Swimming Complex in Madeira between 12 and 18 June.

Medalists

Results

S6

S7
Final
7 swimmers from six nations took part.

S8
Heats
11 swimmers from ten nations took part. The swimmers with the top eight times, regardless of heat, advanced to the final.

Final
The final was held on 12 June 2022.

S9

S10

S11

S13

References

2022 World Para Swimming Championships
2022 in women's swimming